Sparks the Rescue's Hey, Mr. Allure EP is the band's second release, and first to feature lead vocalist Alex Roy. All three songs were re-released on the 2007 EP, The Secrets We Can't Keep.

Track listing
All songs written by Sparks the Rescue.

"Nurse! Nurse! (I'm Losing My Patients)" – 3:41
"Saco Boys Have No Class" – 3:48
"The Scene: Your Bedroom" – 3:01

References 

2006 EPs
Sparks the Rescue EPs